This is a list of weapons used by Czechoslovakia during its interwar period (1918–1938). These include weapons that were designed and manufactured in Czechoslovakia and Czechoslovak modifications to existing weapons, like the Schwarzlose machine gun. After the dissolution of the Second Czechoslovak Republic, many of these weapons saw combat in World War II: with the Axis Slovak Republic and with Nazi Germany after it occupied Czechoslovakia. These weapons also saw widespread use abroad after being sold off to international buyers.

Small arms

Pistols 

 Pistole vz. 22
 Pistole vz. 24
 ČZ vz. 27
 ČZ vz. 38

Rifles 

 Vz. 98/22
 Vz. 24
 Vz. 33
 ZH-29

Submachine guns 

 ZK-383
 KP vz. 38

Machine guns 

 ZB vz. 26 (main inspiration for Bren gun alongside the updated ZB vz 30)
 ZB vz. 30
 Schwarzlose machine gun (Schwarzlose-Janeček vz.07/24 variant)
 ZB-53 (main inspiration for Besa gun)
 ZB-50
 ZB-60 (main inspiration for Besa 15 mm heavy machine gun)

Mortars 

 8 cm minomet vz. 36

Artillery

Tank and Anti-tank guns 

 3,7cm KPÚV vz. 34 (main armament of Czechoslovak tank LT vz 34 and LT vz 35 the latter AKA Panzer 35(t))
 4cm kanón vz. 36
 3,7cm KPÚV vz. 37
 3,7cm ÚV vz. 38 (main armament of Czechoslovak LT vz 38 tank AKA Panzer 38(t))
 4,7cm KPÚV vz. 38 (gun of Panzerjager I)

Field guns and Mountain guns 

 Skoda 75 mm Model 1928
 Skoda 75 mm Model 1936
 Skoda 75 mm Model 1939
 8 cm kanon vz. 28
 8 cm kanon vz. 30
Skoda houfnice vz 14
Skoda 100 mm Model 16/19
10 cm houfnice vz. 28
10 cm houfnice vz. 30 (howitzer)
10.5 cm hruby kanon vz. 35
Skoda 105 mm Model 1939

Heavy artillery 

 15 cm hrubá houfnice vz. 25
 Skoda K series
 Skoda Model 1928 Gun
 21 cm Mörser M. 16/18
 21 cm Kanone 39
 210 mm gun M1939 (Br-17)
 Skoda 220 mm howitzer
 24 cm Haubitze 39
 305 mm howitzer M1939 (Br-18)

Anti-Aircraft artillery 

 2cm VKPL vz 36(Oerlikon 20 mm cannon)
 7.5 cm kanon PL vz. 37
 8 cm PL kanon vz. 37
 8.35 cm PL kanon vz. 22
 9 cm kanon PL vz. 12/20

Naval artillery 

 Skoda 14 cm/56 naval gun

Armoured fighting vehicles

Tanks 

 Kolohousenka
 LT vz. 34
 LT vz 35 (Panzer 35(t))
 LT vz 38(Panzer 38(t))
 ST vz 39 (commercial designation V-8-H)

Tankettes 

 Tančík vz. 33
 Škoda MU-4
 AH-IV

Armoured cars 

 OA vz. 27
 OA vz. 30

See also 
Battle of Czajánek's barracks

References

Military history of Czechoslovakia
Inter-war
20th century in Czechoslovakia